Club Social y Deportivo San Martín (usually referred to as San Martín de Burzaco) is a sports club based in Burzaco, Buenos Aires Province. Its football team currently plays in Primera C, which is the regionalised fourth tier of the Argentine Football Association league system.

History
In the 1860s the Buenos Aires Great Southern Railway built  a warehouse with a train station, which was named in honour of Francisco and Eugenio Burzaco, who donated the largest portion of lands for the construction and development of tracks and stations. The town of Burzaco gradually developed around it.

The club was founded about 70 years later, and named "San Martín" as a tribute to José de San Martín, who liberated Argentina, Chile and Perú from the Spanish Empire.

Since the beginning of the professional era of Argentine football in 1931, the club has never played in the top divisions.

Squad

Titles
Primera División D: 2
 1983, Clausura 1996

References

External links

Official site 
Sanma Lokura 
Sanma 

 
Association football clubs established in 1936
Almirante Brown Partido
1936 establishments in Argentina